Tim Besley may refer to:

 Tim Besley (born 1961), British businessman
 Tim Besley (public servant) (Morrish Alexander Besley, born 1927), Australian engineer and businessman